Billesley is a village and civil parish in the Stratford district of Warwickshire, England, just off the A46 road, between Stratford and Alcester.  According to the 2001 Census, the parish had a population of 46. From the 2011 Census the population of the civil parish had been included with Haselor. The population of Billesley is divided into three categories: The Kerby family, The Mumfords, and the staff of the well-known Billesley Manor Hotel.  Billesley is mentioned in the Domesday Book, and is so called because 'The Lea' belonged to Billesley. It had a population of about 150 at that time, but most of them were wiped out by the Black Death. 

It has its own Church of All Saints. Due to the small population of Billesley, it does not have services every week. Services are held on the first Sunday of each month when possible. The church is not registered for marriages and comes under the Parish of Wilmcote. Of particular interest to architectural historians are the traditional closed family pews, as well as the miniature lofts; the church itself is a pocket gem of 18th century design. Billesley Manor has a key to the church, but they do not own the church. Billesley Manor itself was originally a private home and the manor's tenants owned more of the land than the house is set on now. The building dates from c.1610 and is a grade II* listed building. The original owners are buried in the churchyard. Like many of the local churches, it is rumoured that William Shakespeare was a regular visitor, at least to the tiny churchyard that predates the later church.

References

External links

Villages in Warwickshire